Germanium dichloride dioxane is a chemical compound with the formula  is 1,4-dioxane.  It is a white solid.  The compound is notable as a source of Ge(II), which contrasts with the pervasiveness of Ge(IV) compounds.  This dioxane complex represents a well-behaved form of germanium dichloride.

Synthesis and structure
It is prepared by reduction of a dioxane solution of germanium tetrachloride with tributyltin hydride:

Hydrosilanes have also been used as reductants.

The complex has a polymeric structure.  Germanium adopts an SF4-like shape with cis Cl ligands (Cl-Ge-Cl angle = 94.4°) and axial positions occupied by oxygen provided by a bridging dioxane. The Ge-O and Ge-Cl distances are  2.40 and 2.277 A, respectively.

Reactions
The complex is used in the preparation of organogermanium compounds.  In organic synthesis, the complex is used as a Lewis acid with reducing properties.

References

Germanium(II) compounds
Chlorides
Nonmetal halides